Jean Naert (28 May 1904 – 28 December 1962) was a Belgian racing cyclist. He rode in the 1931 Tour de France.

References

1904 births
1962 deaths
Belgian male cyclists
Place of birth missing